Margit is a feminine given name, a version of Margaret. 

People bearing the name include:

Margit of Hungary (1175–1223), Empress consort of Isaac II Angelos, Byzantine Emperor
Saint Margit of Hungary (1242–1271), Hungarian nun and princess
Margit Albrechtsson (1918–1994), Swedish cross country skier
Margit Anna (1913–1991), Hungarian painter
Margit Bara (born 1928), Hungarian actress
Margit Beck (1918–1997), Hungarian-born American painter
Margit Brandt (born 1945), Danish fashion designer
Margit Carlqvist (born 1932), Swedish actress
Margit Carstensen (born 1940), German actress
Margit Dajka (1907–1986), Hungarian actress
Margit Danÿ (1906–1975), Hungarian fencer
Margit Elek (1910–1986), Hungarian fencer
Margit Eskman (1925–1990), Finnish politician
Margit Fischer (born 1943), First Lady of Austria, wife of President Heinz Fischer
Margit Graf (born 1951), Austrian luger
Margit Gréczi (born 1941), Hungarian painter
Margit Hansen-Krone (born 1925), Norwegian politician
Margit Haslund (1885–1963), Norwegian women's advocate and politician
Margit Hvammen (1932–2010), Norwegian alpine skier
Margit Kaffka (1880–1918), Hungarian writer and poet
Margit Korondi (born 1932), Hungarian gymnast
Margit Kovács (1902–1977), Hungarian ceramist and sculptor
Margit Kristian (1913–2008), Yugoslavian fencer
Margit Makay (1891–1989), Hungarian actress
Margit Müller (born 1952), German field hockey player
Margit Mutso (born 1966), Estonian architect
Margit Osterloh (born 1943), German engineer
Margit Paar, German luger
Margit Pörtner (born 1972), Danish curler
Margit Rösler, German mathematician
Margit Rüütel (born 1983), Estonian tennis player
Margit Saad (born 1929), German actress
Margit Sandemo (born 1924), Norwegian-Swedish writer
Margit Schiøtt (1889–1946), Norwegian politician
Margit Schumann (born 1952), German luger
Margit Senf (born 1945), German figure skater
Margit Slachta (1884–1974), Hungarian religion activist
Margit Sebők (1939–2000), Hungarian painter and educator
Margit Sutrop (born 1963), Estonian philosopher, ethicist, academic, and politician
Margit Tøsdal (1918–1993), Norwegian politician
Margit Varga (1908–2005), American painter, art director, and journalist
Margit Warburg (born 1952), Danish sociologist
Margit Evelyn Newton, Italian actress
Busk Margit Jonsson (born 1929), Swedish opera singer
Gunn Margit Andreassen (born 1973), Norwegian biathlete

Danish feminine given names
Estonian feminine given names
German feminine given names
Given names derived from gemstones
Hungarian feminine given names
Norwegian feminine given names
Scandinavian feminine given names
Swedish feminine given names